The second season of Shake It Up aired on Disney Channel from September 18, 2011 to August 17, 2012. It consisted of 28 episodes, giving the series a total of 49 episodes thus far. Caroline Sunshine was added to the main cast this season.

Production and release
On March 16, 2011, the series was picked up for its second season. A few months later, it was announced that the series would begin with a one-hour special episode and that it would be aired later that fall. Production for the season filmed from July 2011 to March 2012. The second season officially premiered on September 18, 2011, but the one-hour special episode did not premiere as planned due to episodes being shown out of order. Disney Channel ordered the season to have 26 episodes, but it actually had 28 episodes. On August 17, 2012, the series concluded with a 90-minute special episode called "Shake It Up: Made In Japan." Showrunner and executive producer Chris Thompson had left before the second season, so executive producer Rob Lotterstein took Thompson's place as showrunner and Jeff Strauss joined Lotterstein as executive producers. Eileen Conn remained in her role as co-executive producer, but became executive producer with Lotterstein and Strauss in the season finale. David Holden replaced John D. Beck, Ron Hart, Ron Zimmerman, and Howard J. Morris as consulting producer.

Synopsis
CeCe and Rocky discover issues in their friendship. Throughout the season, they're usually arguing and things start to get out of hand on Shake It Up, Chicago. Other things include Rocky and CeCe trying to step up their game by getting even more famous beyond their gigs on the show. The show starts to fall apart all throughout the season. In the meantime, Flynn becomes more interested in outdoor activities, like biking (which he doesn't know how to do as mentioned in "Judge It Up") and camping activities. Ty tries to begin his rapping career, but things go awry when he fails to have "the proper rapping skills." Deuce gets a job at his uncle's restaurant "Crusty's" and develops relationship issues with Dina. Gunther and Tinka try to join in with the rest of the gang as they are usually bonding with the characters on certain events.

Opening sequence
The opening theme starts with Rocky and CeCe dancing on the wing of an airplane (as shown in "Shake It Up, Up, and Away") doing a dance routine, then showing various clips of the cast members (some clips from season 1 are also included), starting off with Zendaya and Bella Thorne, then going in order with Davis Cleveland, Roshon Fegan, Adam Irigoyen, and Kenton Duty. Caroline Sunshine is now added to the opening credits with a few clips shown of her character. It then shows more various clips of the cast members as it gives credit to the creator of the series, Chris Thompson. A final clip shows Rocky and CeCe dancing next to the Shake It Up logo as in season one, but they are wearing different outfits. Selena Gomez sings the theme song.

Music

The second soundtrack "Shake It Up: Live 2 Dance" was released on March 20, 2012. "Up, Up, and Away" was released as the first single from the album on February 14, 2012 and "Something to Dance For" (by Zendaya) and "TTYLXOX" (by Bella Thorne) were both released as the second and third singles on March 6, 2012, respectively. The mash-up video "Something to Dance For/TTYLXOX Mash-Up" was released on March 9, 2012 during an episode of Jessie. On August 21, 2012, the extended edition "Shake It Up: Made In Japan" was released with three new songs and a music video. "Fashion Is My Kryptonite" was released on July 20, 2012 as a promotional single with an accompanying music video, which was released on August 3, 2012. The soundtrack was the best-selling soundtrack of the year.

Cast 

 Bella Thorne as CeCe Jones
 Zendaya as Rocky Blue
 Davis Cleveland as Flynn Jones
 Roshon Fegan as Ty Blue
 Adam Irigoyen as Deuce Martinez
 Kenton Duty as Gunther Hessenheffer
 Caroline Sunshine as Tinka Hessenheffer

Episodes

References

2
2011 American television seasons
2012 American television seasons